Frances Fredericks (born September 23, 1935) is an American politician who served in the Mississippi House of Representatives from the 119th district from 1990 to 2012.

References

1935 births
Living people
Democratic Party members of the Mississippi House of Representatives